David Peter Bampton (born 5 May 1985) is an English footballer who plays as a midfielder. He played in the Football League for Swindon Town. He is currently with Swindon Supermarine.

Playing career

Swindon Town
Bampton joined his local side Swindon Town as a trainee in 2001 and was the captain of the club's youth team, the following season he was given a professional contract with the club.

Bampton drifted his way into the first team squad on occasions during the 2002/03 season. Bampton made his first-team debut as a substitute in the 1–0 defeat at Oxford United in an FA Cup tie on 8 December 2002.

In total Bampton made three League One appearances, coming on as a substitute in all three, he made two appearances against home and away to Plymouth Argyle and one at home against Luton Town, but after failing to make a single appearance during 2003/04, Bampton was released at the end of that season.

Tamworth
On 9 May 2005 Mark Cooper made Bampton one of his first signings, after taking over as manager of Conference National side Tamworth for the 2005/06 season. Bampton proved himself to be very much a utility player slotting into defence or midfield as required, and has made himself somewhat a fans favourite with his never say die displays. Bampton also played a major part in the club's historic highest ever league finish, when the club finished 15th, during his first season he made 22 appearances, scoring one goal.

Bampton agreed another one-year deal for the 2005/06 season, and continued to show some very impressive displays for the Conference club, most noticeably on a bigger stage in the FA Cup ties against Stoke City. Bampton made 24 appearances again finding the net once.

Bampton continued to show his loyalty to Tamworth overlooking other offers to sign a further one-year contract with the club. Bampton's performances prompted England non-league national manager Paul Fairclough, but cruelly for Bampton injury prevented him from making his debut. Unfortunatately for Bampton the 2006/07 season was dogged by injury, limiting him to only nine appearances.

On 2 July 2007 it was confirmed that Bampton arrived for pre-season training with Tamworth and was in discussion over terms of a new offer of a contact for the 2007/08 season, and it is believed that Bampton will commit to the club, despite the club's relegation to the Conference North.

On 5 July 2007, local newspaper Tamworth Herald reported that Bampton had signed a deal with Tamworth in time for the 2007/08 season.

References

External links

Tamworth FC Profile

1985 births
Living people
English footballers
Swindon Town F.C. players
Tamworth F.C. players
Worcester City F.C. players
Association football midfielders
English Football League players
Sportspeople from Swindon
Swindon Supermarine F.C. players